The Redwood Grove of Henry Cowell Redwoods State Park, which is located in Santa Cruz County in Northern California, is a grove of Coast Redwoods with member trees extending into the 1400- to 1800-year-old range.  This grove is notable because it allows for the use of self-guided tours of the flat,  loop trail which is easily accessible (within  of a vehicle parking lot).  Dozens of large, old Redwood trees are located within a few feet of the walking trail.

Natural history
Coast Redwoods, (Sequoia sempervirens), are a native tree in the deep valleys and low to middle elevations (up to 750 m) of  the Santa Cruz Mountains.  Their growth and longevity is enhanced by the proximity to the ocean with its massive amounts of precipitation, the cool air which encourages fog, and the dimmer sunlight near the moisture-rich trunk-base region.  Free-flowing, year-round stream help to enhance this environment and the cool, moisture-laden air often produces visible fog, which helps to replenish the trees.  The bark of these giants is heavily laden with tannin, which helps to offer protection from damage by either fires or insects.

This grove has some of the tallest and oldest trees in the Henry Cowell Redwoods State Park, because the environment has been preserved to maintain a natural ecology.  Undergrowth is never cleared, there is no logging allowed and deadfalls and lightning-struck trees are allowed to proceed naturally with their processes, unless they impair access to the grove.  This rich, biotic environment is filled with natural nutrients which make up for the massive amounts of waterfall which might otherwise deplete the soil.  Old growth groves such as this will show the birth (shoots and burls) and death (rotting trees and "fairy rings") of ancient redwoods, many of whose birth was before the Battle of Hastings in 1066.

Of course, all the native flora and fauna which have existed in these mountains for centuries are allowed to remain—even to the extent of the highly irritating poison oak plants.

Early history
This part of the California coastline was once a tribal area for the Awaswas (Santa Cruz) division of Ohlone Indian people.  In 1769, Gaspar de Portolà camped on the banks of the San Lorenzo River and erected a wooden cross to mark the location as part of his exploration for Spain.  This exploration offered the peoples of this richly, resourced area, known as Alta California, to be brought under Catholicism by the Friars Minor.  Little more than twenty years later, in 1791, a Catholic mission, Mission Santa Cruz was consecrated nearby.  This mission, served as a site for ecclesiastical conversion of natives.  From 1805 to 1812, the mission was run by Father Andrés Quintana who was one of only two Spanish missionaries martyred in Alta California.

After the Mexican War of Independence in 1821, the newly independent Mexico assumed control of this area until the transfer to the United States in 1846.  During Mexican ownership, it was common for land grants to be  sold to those who were in favor with the government.  Large portions of this virgin-forested area were given out as Rancho Carbonera, Rancho Zayante and Rancho Cañada del Rincon en el Rio San Lorenzo.  These "gifted" land grants were the start of European settlement in the area that is now known as Henry Cowell Redwoods State Park.  In 1843, the Mexican Government granted a parcel of  under the name of Rancho Cañada del Rincon en el Rio San Lorenzo de Santa Cruz to a French immigrant named Pedro Sansevain.  This grant essentially encompassed what is today known as the Henry Cowell Redwoods State Park.  After a few transfers of land over about twenty years, the granted Rancho Cañada del Rincon ended up in the hands of Henry Cowell.

Trail Details

 Coastal Zone Environment  The Coastal Redwoods grow exceptionally well in this temperate, foggy environment.  This is the perfect environment for the trees, since it is moist, dim and far enough from the coast so that there is no salt in the air.
 The red color of Redwood Trees? These trees have a much higher level of tannic acid in their bark than other trees, giving them the red color.
 Fire Resistance  The high level of tannic acid in the wood and bark in combination with the thickness of the bark (6-12") help to provide a resistance to natural and man-made fires.  The growth layer, protected by the thick bark, allow a healing process to occur after damage.
 Other Species  Douglas Firs are often found interspersed with Coastal Redwoods as they are adapted to the same environment.
 Circular Groups  "Fairy Rings" and "Cathedral Groups" are typically see in Redwood forests as examples of the incredible rejuvenating  ability of these species.  The death of a tree often results in the growth of a number of new trees in a ring around the nutrients-rich, decaying center. Burls from the original tree as well as seeds  which have fallen at the base of the trunk provide this new life.  The missing central tree allows for a "hole" in the vegetative canopy so that the new plants has sufficient light for growth.
 Decaying Trees  Since this is a protected area, trees which have fallen to the ground are allowed to decay and provide shelter for insects.  This results in further nutrients for the remaining live trees in the area.
 The Fremont Tree.  The story is told that in 1846, when Lt. John C. Fremont explored this part of California, he and his party camped overnight in the burned-out base of this tree.  The interior is larger than the typical military tent of the 1840s, which would have offered a splendid shelter for several adults.  When asked to confirm the story during and interview in 1888, his comment was, "It makes a great story, let it stand."
 Burls These wart-like bumps which appear on the sides of the trunk and roots of Redwood trees are a part of the growth layer of the tree.  Often small shoots will grow from burls and roots which result, over time, in significant reforestation.

Hazards

Poison oak is a native ground-cover in the Santa Cruz Mountains.  The plants are most obvious during the part of the year when the leaves change color toward the red spectrum.  Most of the years, the plants are only recognized by the shape of their lobed-leaves, making them more hazardous to the unaware.

None of the poison oak plants are removed in this grove in a commitment to preserving the natural aspect of the area.

Gallery

Notes

See also
 Spanish missions in California
 Awaswas

References
 
 
 
 
 
 
California State Parks

External links
 Detailed map of Henry Cowell Redwoods State Park
 Panorama of Old Growth Redwood Trail

Henry Cowell
Forests of California
Henry Cowell
Henry Cowell
Henry Cowell
1846 establishments in Alta California
California Historical Landmarks
Roman Catholic Diocese of Monterey in California
Santa Cruz Mountains